Based on the Punjab Village Panchayats and Neighbourhood Councils Bill 2019 (PVPaNCB 2019), published April 23, 2019, Union Councils (UCs) will be replaced by Neighbourhood Councils (NCs). While this law will result in much smaller council areas for the panchayats in rural areas and for the NCs in smaller towns and cities, the change for the City District of Lahore, Pakistan, will be limited. In first schedule of the PVPaNCB 2019 (p. 23), the maximum of permitted neighbourhoods for Lahore is fixed as 280. Since 2015, 274 Union Councils have existed in the City District of Lahore.

The names and boundaries of the new neighbourhoods will be published in the official Punjab gazette before the end of October 2019. Each neighbourhood will have 36.000 to 44.000 inhabitants based on the data of the 2017 census.

As of 2001, 152 Union Councils existed in the City District of Lahore. Based on  the number of Union Councils increased to 274, as listed further below in

List of Union Councils as of 2015
From 2015 on there have been 274 Union Councils in Lahore.

List of Union Councils 2001-2015
Under the 2001 revision of Pakistan's administrative structure Lahore was tagged as a City District, and divided into nine towns. Each town in turn consists of a group of Union Councils. All in all 152 Union Councils existed in the City District of Lahore, including the Cantonment area.

*Independent municipality under Lahore Cantonment Board.

References

Lahore-related lists
Towns in Lahore